CygnusEd is a text editor for the Amiga OS and MorphOS. It was first developed in 1986-1987 by Bruce Dawson, Colin Fox and Steve LaRocque who were working for CygnusSoft Software. It was the first Amiga text editor with an undo/redo feature and one of the first Amiga programs that had an AREXX scripting port by which it was possible to integrate the editor with AREXX enabled C compilers and build a semi-integrated development environment. Many Amiga programmers grew up with CygnusEd and a considerable part of the Amiga software library was created with CygnusEd. It is still one of very few text editors that support jerkyless soft scrolling.

It remained popular even after Commodore's bankruptcy in 1994. In 1997 version 4 was developed by Olaf Barthel and was ported to MorphOS by Ralph Schmidt in 2000 and made available for users having the original CygnusED 4 CDROM. In 2007 version 5 was finished by Olaf Barthel again, which runs natively on AmigaOS 2 and AmigaOS 4.

References

Text editors
Amiga development software
AmigaOS 4 software
MorphOS software
Rexx
TeX editors